Deion Turman is an American professional basketball player, born August 13, 1992. The 6-8, 215-pound center played his high school ball at Mt. Lebanon, where he helped his team to the 2010 Western Pennsylvania Interscholastic Athletic League class 4A state title. Turman averaged 10.1 points per game and 12.9 rebounds per game while guiding his team to a 25-3 overall record as a high school senior. Deion received a scholarship from Robert Morris for the 2010-2011 season where he contributed 9 points and 15 rebounds. Deion left Robert Morris after his first year to take a scholarship at Wingate University for the remainder of his college career.

In the 2014-2015 season with the Reading Rockets (EBL, UK), Turman received honors for All British EBL Division 1 - Second Team, and All British EBL Division 1 - All Import Team 
as well as Reading Rockets team award of MIP.

Wingate Season Statistics:

Notable Honors:
All SAC Honors in 2014, 2013 ·
All-State Honors 2014 ·
SAC Player of the Week 2014, 2013 ·
Monroe Player of the Week, 2014, 2013
All Tournament Player 2011-2012

In July 2014 Deion signed as a professional basketball player with Strategic Sports. In August, he went on to sign with the Reading Rockets (United Kingdom)

References 

http://www.eurobasket.com/United-Kingdom/news/403312/Eurobasket.com-All-British-EBL-Division-One-Awards-2015

External links 
 Reading Rockets web page
 Wingate Bulldog's statistics
 EBL Division 1 2015 Honorees

Living people
1992 births
Basketball players from Pennsylvania
Robert Morris Colonials men's basketball players
Wingate Bulldogs men's basketball players
American men's basketball players